The 2022/23 FIS Cup (ski jumping) was the 18th FIS Cup season in ski jumping for men and the 11th for women.

Other competitive circuits this season include the World Cup, Grand Prix, Continental Cup, Alpen Cup and New Star Trophy. 

Francisco Mörth from Austria and Sina Arnet from Switzerland were the defending overall champions from the 2021–22 season.

Men

Calendar

Overall standings

Women

Calendar

Overall standings

Podium table by nation 
Table showing the FIS Cup podium places (gold–1st place, silver–2nd place, bronze–3rd place) by the countries represented by the athletes.

Notes

References 

2022 in ski jumping
2023 in ski jumping
FIS Cup (ski jumping)